A constitutional referendum was held in France on 21 October 1945. Voters were asked whether they approved of the Assembly elected on the same day serving as a Constituent Assembly, and whether until a new constitution was approved, the country would be governed according to a proposed set of laws that appeared on the ballot paper. If the first proposal had not been approved, the Third Republic would have been restored, but its approval led to the elected Assembly drafting a constitution and proposing it to the people a year later, resulting in the creation of the Fourth Republic. Both were approved by wide margins with a turnout of 79.8%.

Results

Question I

Question II

See also
 1945 French constitutional referendum in Algeria
 1945 French constitutional referendum in Cameroon
 1945 French constitutional referendum in Chad–Ubangi-Shari
 1945 French constitutional referendum in Dahomey and Togo
 1945 French constitutional referendum in French Somaliland
 1945 French constitutional referendum in French Sudan−Niger
 1945 French constitutional referendum in Gabon–Moyen Congo
 1945 French constitutional referendum in Guinea
 1945 French constitutional referendum in Ivory Coast
 1945 French constitutional referendum in Mauritania−Senegal
 1945 French constitutional referendum in Tunisia

References

Referendums in France
1945 referendums
1945 elections in France
Constitutional referendums in France
October 1945 events in Europe